The 52nd Ordnance Group (EOD) is the command and control headquarters for all U.S. Army Explosive Ordnance Disposal (EOD) Battalions and Companies located east of the Mississippi River in the Continental United States (CONUS). The current command team consists of Colonel Matthew L. Kuhns and Command Sergeant Major Isaac J. Allender. Their command covers 184th and 192nd Ordnance Battalion (EOD), as well as the 63rd Chemical Company (CBRN). Subordinate units maintain EOD Response Teams, which evaluate, render safe, and remove conventional, chemical/biological, or nuclear ordnance, or improvised explosive devices (IEDs) which pose an immediate threat to public safety. While subordinate units are trained and equipped for combat operations, they may also support a variety of peacetime missions, to include range surface clearance operations of active U.S. Army installations, EOD and UXO operations in support of civilian law enforcement agencies, and support to the U.S. Secret Service for protection of VIPs.

Mission 
On order, 52nd Ordnance Group (EOD) deploys and conducts operations ISO Combatant Commanders or other government agencies to counter CBRNE and WMD threats.

Subordinate units 
 52nd Ordnance Group, Explosives Ordnance Disposal (EOD), Fort Campbell
 Headquarters and Headquarters Detachment, Fort Campbell
 184th Ordnance Battalion (EOD), Fort Campbell
 Headquarters and Headquarters Company, Fort Campbell
 38th Ordnance Company (EOD), Fort Stewart
 49th Ordnance Company (EOD), Fort Campbell
 717th Ordnance Company (EOD), Fort Campbell
 723rd Ordnance Company (EOD), Fort Campbell
 744th Ordnance Company (EOD), Fort Campbell
 756th Ordnance Company (EOD), Fort Stewart
 789th Ordnance Company (EOD), Fort Benning
  192nd Ordnance Battalion (EOD), Fort Bragg
 Headquarters and Headquarters Company, Fort Bragg
 18th Ordnance Company (EOD), Fort Bragg
  28th Ordnance Company (EOD) (Airborne), Fort Bragg
 55th Ordnance Company (EOD), Fort Belvoir
  722nd Ordnance Company (EOD) (Airborne), Fort Bragg
 754th Ordnance Company (EOD), Fort Drum
 760th Ordnance Company (EOD), Fort Drum
  767th Ordnance Company (EOD) (Airborne), Fort Bragg

Lineage 
 Constituted 20 December 1943 in the Army of the United States as Headquarters and Headquarters Detachment, 52d Ordnance Group
 Activated 27 December 1943 at Camp Hood, Texas
 Reorganized and redesigned 27 May 1946 as Headquarters and Headquarters Detachment, 52d Ordnance Service Group
 Reorganized and redesigned 20 December 1946 as the 52d Ordnance Composite Group
 Inactivated 30 June 1948 in Austria
 Redesignated 8 January 1952 as Headquarters and Headquarters Company, 52d Ordnance Group, and allotted to the Regular Army
 Activated 28 January 1952 at Fort Bragg, North Carolina
 Inactivated 16 May 1955 at Fort Bragg, North Carolina
 Activated 2 December 1965 at Fort Bragg, North Carolina
 Inactivated 20 October 1967 in Vietnam
 Redesignated 1 October 1993 as Headquarters and Headquarters Detachment, 52D Ordnance Group (EOD), and activated at Fort Gillem, Georgia
 Reassigned in early 2009 to Fort Campbell, KY with 184 OD BN (EOD)

Honors

Campaign participation credit 
 World War II:
Normandy
Northern France
Rhineland
Ardennes-Alsace
Central Europe

 Vietnam
Counteroffensive
Counteroffensive, Phase II
Counteroffensive, Phase III

Decorations 
 Meritorious Unit Commendation (Army)
 Streamer Embroidered VIETNAM 1966.

References

External links 
 

Ordnance 052
Military units and formations established in 1943
Explosive ordnance disposal units and formations
Bomb disposal
Ordnance units and formations of the United States Army